The 2016 Saint Francis Red Flash football team represented Saint Francis University in the 2016 NCAA Division I FCS football season. They were led by seventh-year head coach Chris Villarrial and played their home games at DeGol Field. They were a member of the Northeast Conference. They finished the season 7–5, 5–1 in NEC play to finish in a tie for the conference title with Duquesne. Due to their head-to-head win over Duquesne, they received the NEC's automatic bid to the FCS Playoffs where they lost in the first round to Villanova.

Schedule

Source: Schedule

Games summaries

at Montana

at Towson

at Columbia

at Albany

Malone

at Robert Morris

Bryant

Duquesne

at Sacred Heart

Central Connecticut

at Wagner

FCS Playoffs

First Round–Villanova

Ranking movements

References

Saint Francis
Saint Francis Red Flash football seasons
Northeast Conference football champion seasons
Saint Francis
Saint Francis Red Flash football